Bastak County is in Hormozgan province, Iran. The capital of the county is the city of Bastak. At the 2006 census, the county's population was 65,716 in 13,563 households. The following census in 2011 counted 80,119 people in 18,780 households. At the 2016 census, the county's population was 80,492 in 21,684 households.

Bastak was traditionally part of the region of Irahistan. Bastak's inhabitants are  Sunni Muslim and speak Achomi (Larestani) language. The Bastaki accent of Achomi language is very similar to the Khonji, Gerashi and Fedaghi and Evazi and other regional accents.

Administrative divisions

The population history of Bastak County's administrative divisions over three consecutive censuses is shown in the following table. The latest census shows three districts, seven rural districts, and two cities.

See also 
Larestan
Khonj County
Gerash County
Lamerd County
Evaz

References

 

Counties of Hormozgan Province